Rick Kennett (born 1956) is an Australian writer of science fiction, horror and ghost stories. He is the most prolific and widely published genre author in Australia after Paul Collins, Terry Dowling and Greg Egan, with stories in a wide variety of magazines and anthologies in Australia, the US and the UK.

His first published short story was "Troublesome Green" (1979).

A number of his stories have been printed multiple times due to his habit of resubmission - for instance, "Isle of the Dancing Dead" and "The Battle of Leila the Dog".

A number of his ghost stories feature the recurring character Ernie Pine, known as "the reluctant ghost-hunter". An excerpt of an intended novel featuring Pine, Abracadabra, appeared in Bloodsongs 2 (1994). Retitled The Devil and the Deep Blue Sea, the novel was published by Cooperative Press in 2013.

Another continuing character in his work is the Lesbian "trained killer for the state" Cy De Gerch, the heroine of his novel Presumed Dead and the collection Thirty Minutes for New Hell.

Some of Kennett's work is science fiction, but some of his science fiction stories feature ghosts, thus his work crosses genre boundaries that are often kept separate.

Kennett was an early contributor to The Australian Horror and Fantasy Magazine and also had stories published in its successor Terror Australis and the anthology Terror Australis: Best Australian Horror. Several stories by Kennett including "Out of the Storm", his story from the Terror Australis anthology, have been produced as audio productions at The Dunesteef Audio Fiction Magazine: 

He has collaborated on occasion with other Australian writers of horror, for instance Barry Radburn, Paul Collins and Bryce J. Stevens.

The St James Guide to Horror, Ghost and Gothic Writers points out that Kennett is "really the one Australian writer to have produced a substantial body of work in the ghost-story field" - while Rob Hood and Terry Dowling have also produced significant quantities of ghost stories, Kennett's concentration on the genre makes him the leading specialist in Australia.

Reggie Oliver, reviewing 472 Cheyne Walk: Carnacki, the Untold Stories, has called Kennett "prodigally inventive" and Peter Worthy of Black Book webzine has called the book "a dazzling continuation of William Hope Hodgson's Carnacki the Ghost-Finder"

Kennett works as possibly the longest-serving motorbike courier in Australia.

Bibliography

Novels
 The Devil and the Deep Blue Sea (Cooperative Ink, 2013) (Ernie Pine series)
 In Quinn's Paddock (Cooperative Ink, 2016)
 Presumed Dead (Cooperative Ink, 2016)

Collections
The Reluctant Ghost-Hunter (UK: Ghost Story Society, 1991)
No. 472 Cheyne Walk (UK: Ghost Story Society, 1992) (with A. F. 'Chico' Kidd)Chapbook
Thirteen: Ghost Stories (Jacobyte Books, 2001)
472 Cheyne Walk: Carnacki, the Untold Stories (with A.F. 'Chico' Kidd) (Ash-Tree Press, 2002)
 The Dark and What It Said (Cooperative Ink, 2016)
 Thirty Minutes for New Hell (Cooperative Ink, 2016)

Short fiction
"In Quinn's Paddock" (2003) in Southern Blood: New Australian Tales of the Supernatural (ed. Bill Congreve)
"The Dark and What It Said" (2007) in Andromeda Spaceways Inflight Magazine #28 (ed. Zara Baxter)

Awards

Wins
 EOD magazine Best Short Story Award (for "Dead Air"), 1992.
 2008 Ditmar Award: Short Fiction: "The Dark and What it Said"
 2013 Parsec (podcast award) large cast, short form "The Road to Utopia Plain"
 2013 Parsec (podcast award) single reader, short form "Now Cydonia"

Nominations

2008 Ditmar Award, Short story: "The Dark and What It Said"
2008 Aurealis Award, Horror short story: "The Dark and What It Said"
2002 Ditmar Award: Short fiction: "Whispers" (with Paul Collins) Note: Story appeared in Collins' collection Stalking Midnight(Cosmos Books).
2002 Aurealis Award: Horror short story: "Whispers" (with Paul Collins)
1998 Ditmar Award: Short fiction: "The Willcroft Inheritance" (with Paul Collins)
1993 Ditmar Award: Short fiction: "The Seas of Castle Hill Road"

References

 Mike Ashley & William G. Contento. The Supernatural Index: A Listing of Fantasy, Supernatural, Occult, Weird and Horror Anthologies. Westport, CT: Greenwood Press, 1995, pp. 332–33.
 Aurealis Awards winners archive Retrieved 17-2-2008.
 Leigh Blackmore. "Rick Kennett" in S.T. Joshi and Stefan Dziemianowicz (eds). Supernatural Literature of the World: An Encyclopedia. Westport, CT: Greenwood Press, 2005, pp. 653–4.
 Russell Blackford; Van Ikin and Sean McMullen. Strange Constellations: A History of Australian Science Fiction. Westport, CT: Greenwood Press, 1999, p. 126.
 Paul Collins (ed). The MUP Encyclopedia of Australian Science Fiction and Fantasy. Melbourne, Vic: Melbourne University press, 1998, pp. 103–04.
 Van Ikin. "From Troublesome Green to Ernie Pine: An Interview with Rick Kennett". Science Fiction, 40 (1997):36-44.
 Inkspillers Ditmar Awards archive. Retrieved 17-2-2008.
 Steven Paulsen and Sean McMullen "Rick Kennett" in David Pringle (ed). The St James Guide to Horror, Ghosts and Gothic Writers. Detroit, MI; St James Press, 1998.

External links
 
 Various audio adaptations of stories by Kennett are available for download: 
 "Out of the Storm" story originally published in Terror Australis: Best Australian Horror Audio production available at 
 ''Time in a Rice Bowl" (Ernie Pine story) Audio production available at 

1956 births
Living people
Australian horror writers
Australian science fiction writers